Atlanta is an American comedy-drama television series created by Donald Glover that centers on college dropout and music manager Earnest "Earn" Marks (Glover) and rapper Paper Boi (Brian Tyree Henry) as they navigate the Atlanta rap scene. It also stars Lakeith Stanfield and Zazie Beetz.

The series premiered on September 6, 2016, on FX. The fourth and final season premiered on September 15, 2022.

Series overview

Episodes

Season 1 (2016)

Season 2: Robbin' Season (2018)

Season 3 (2022)

Season 4 (2022)

References

External links 
 
 

Atlanta (TV series)
Lists of American comedy-drama television series episodes